Ole Bakken (24 May 1922 – 30 January 1992) was a Canadian basketball player. He competed in the men's tournament at the 1948 Summer Olympics.

References

1922 births
1992 deaths
Canadian men's basketball players
Olympic basketball players of Canada
Basketball players at the 1948 Summer Olympics
People from Harstad
Basketball players from Vancouver
UBC Thunderbirds basketball players
Norwegian emigrants to Canada